Christchurch Girls' High School in Christchurch, New Zealand, was established in 1877 and is the second oldest girls-only secondary school in the country, after Otago Girls' High School.

History
Christchurch Girls' High School was established in 1877, four years before Christchurch Boys' High School. The first headmistress was Mrs. Georgiana Ingle (a daughter of Richard Deodatus Poulett-Harris and half-sister of Lily Poulett-Harris). The second principal Helen Connon (later Helen Macmillan Brown) is better known as she was the first woman in any British university to gain an Honours degree.

The school's original building on Cranmer Square, which was renamed the Cranmer Centre, features prominently in the 1994 film Heavenly Creatures based on the 1954 Parker–Hulme murder case involving two students.

The school featured in national and international news in 1972 when two students led a "walkout" from school assembly to protest against the inclusion of religion in school morning assemblies. At the time, schools in New Zealand were supposed to be secular but this was largely ignored and students were usually told to bring a note from their parents if they wanted to opt out of the religious component of school assemblies.

In June 2020, students complained that posters they had put up promoting the Black Lives Matter movement were removed without adequate explanation. Students reported that some staff had said the posters could damage the walls, but that other posters were allowed to remain, while the staff member who took the posters down reportedly said it was because "all lives matter". The incident followed similar complaints at two other New Zealand schools, where students had alleged racist motivations for removing posters. Prime Minister Jacinda Ardern, commenting on the issues across the three schools, said that the matters were for schools to deal with, but she did not discourage the students' actions, while Massey University sociologist Paul Spoonley said it was censorship and appeared to be "institutional racism – racism that has come from the school itself".

Present day
Christchurch Girls' High School, known to many as Girls' High or CGHS, provides boarding facilities for 95 students from years 9 to 13 at Acland House, located 20–30 minutes walk away from school.

The school stands by the Avon River, on a site it has occupied since 1986. Previously, the area was occupied by a mill that was first built in 1861 by William Derisley Wood, which became known as the Riccarton Mill.

The February 2011 Christchurch earthquake had a large impact on the school: it caused extensive damage to the current site; the old Cranmer Centre site was damaged so badly that it was later demolished – and the school's principal at the time, Prue Taylor, lost her husband Brian in the CTV Building collapse.

CGHS was the first school to go into lock down during the Christchurch mosque shootings at approximately 1:52pm on 15 March 2019.

The current principal is Christine O'Neill, who started the role in July 2019. Pauline Duthie, previous principal of the school, held the role from 2014 to March 2019 and left to be a principal at Columba College in Dunedin.

Notable alumnae

 Ursula Bethell (1874–1945), poet and social worker
 Alice Candy (1888–1977), academic and second woman lecturer at Canterbury College
 Gay Davidson (1939–2004), journalist
 Eileen Fairbairn (1893–1981), teacher and geographer
 Ivy Fife (1905–1976), painter
 Marama Fox, politician and co-leader of the Māori Party
 Ruth France (1913–1968), novelist and poet
 Helen Gibson (1868–1938), founder of Rangi Ruru Girls' School
 Mary Gibson (1864–1929), Principal of CGHS for thirty years 
 Edith Searle Grossmann (1863–1931), writer and teacher 
 Stella Henderson (1871–1926), first woman Parliamentary reporter for a major New Zealand newspaper
 Elizabeth Herriott (1882–1936), academic and first woman lecturer at Canterbury College
 Margaret Lorimer (1866–1954), mountaineer and Principal of Nelson College for Girls for twenty years 
 Elsie Low (1875–1909), temperance campaigner
 Pauline Parker (born 1938), convicted murderer
 Edna Pengelly (1874–1959), teacher, civilian and military nurse
 Anne Perry (born 1938 as Juliet Hulme), English author and convicted murderer
Christabel Robinson (1898–1988)
 Myrtle Simpson (1905–1981)
 Gwen Somerset (1894–1988), adult educator and writer
 Lucy Spoors (born 1990), Olympic rower
 Phoebe Spoors (born 1993), Olympic rower
 Joyce Watson (1918–2015)
 Fay Weldon, (born 1931), English author

Notable staff 

 Catherine Alexander (1863–1928), first known woman to publish a paper in the Royal Society Te Apārangi's Transactions
 Kate Edger (1857–1935), first woman university graduate in New Zealand
 Emily Foster (1842–1897)
 Christina Henderson (1861–1953)
 Leila Hurle (1901–1989)
 Stephanie Young (1890–1983)
Elsie Low (1875–1909)

References

External links

 School website
Education Review Office (ERO) reports
 Heavenly Creatures Website at Geocities.com

Educational institutions established in 1877
Boarding schools in New Zealand
Girls' schools in New Zealand
Secondary schools in Christchurch
1877 establishments in New Zealand
Alliance of Girls' Schools Australasia